Phares Kashemeza Kabuye was a Member of Parliament in the National Assembly of Tanzania. He died in a car crash in 2009. He was involved in a car crash(bus in Morogoro)he boarded from Biharamulo to attend his Party meeting in the then Capital Dar Es Salaam.

Phares Kabuye served as MP for Biharamulo since 1985 being a member for CCM.

He then lost a seat to the other person before he won it back in 1995 through Tanzania Labor Party(TLP).

He was the only TLP member of the parliament during those era.

Its however noted that he was a very good speaker in the parliament. He was real active.

He was also a member of the Pan African Parliament from Tanzania.

He was also controversial for one time he accused the whole members of the parliament that they got their seats through corruption, giving excuse to Edward Lowassa (The then PM) and himself. This somehow got him in trouble.

He was really a humble person. He lived in a very simple house, and its believed that he had no car hence travelled by public transport (and in a bus he was involved in an accident that took his life)

He went to Middle school and class 10 and went to Teachers College. He quit school in order to get employed that he becomes of help to his siblings, following the passing of his parents.

Sources

Year of birth missing
2009 deaths
Members of the National Assembly (Tanzania)